Keith Smythe (born 9 May 1949) is  a former Australian rules footballer who played with Richmond and St Kilda in the Victorian Football League (VFL).

Notes

External links 		
		
		
		
		
		
		
Living people		
1949 births		
		
Australian rules footballers from Victoria (Australia)		
Richmond Football Club players		
St Kilda Football Club players